Kani Bagh (also Romanized as Kānī Bāgh) is a village in Lahijan-e Sharqi Rural District, Lajan District, Piranshahr County, West Azerbaijan Province, Iran. At the 2006 census, its population was 312, in 53 families.

References 

Populated places in Piranshahr County